Journey Ja-rel Newson (born March 7, 1989) is an American mixed martial artist who competes in the Bantamweight division of the Ultimate Fighting Championship.

Background
Newson grew up in the Merced area. Due to his mother's drug addiction and despite father's attempts to keep the family together, Journey and his siblings were taken into foster care when he was around the age of seven. He started training Tae Kwon Do around the age of 12. He began training Brazilian jiu-jitsu for self-defense around the age of 20 and shifted to mixed martial arts in a couple of years.

Mixed martial arts career

Early career

Newson started out his career in 2015, fighting for a variety of regional West Coast organizations, such as Cage Sport and King of the Cage. During this time, he compiled a 9–1 record, capturing the Cage Sport and Prime Fighting Bantamweight titles.

Ultimate Fighting Championship

Newson made his UFC debut as a late replacement for Sergio Pettis against Ricardo Ramos on June 29, 2019 at UFC on ESPN 3. He lost the fight via unanimous decision.

Newson next faced Domingo Pilarte at UFC 247 on February 8, 2020. He won the fight by TKO within the first minute of the fight. However, on March 25, it was announced by the Texas Department of Licensing and Regulation (TDLR) that Newson had tested positive for marijuana during in-competition drug tests. His victory was overturned to a no contest and he was suspended for 30 days.

Newson was initially scheduled to face Randy Costa on September 26, 2020 at UFC Fight Night: Covington vs. Woodley. However, the event was shifted to take place on September 19, 2020, as UFC 253 was later scheduled for the original date. He lost the fight via knockout in round one.

Newson was scheduled to face Felipe Colares on May 1, 2021 at UFC on ESPN 23. However, Newson withdrew from the bout and was replaced by Luke Sanders.

Newson faced promotional newcomer Fernie Garcia on May 7, 2022 at UFC 274. He won the fight via unanimous decision.

Newson faced Sergey Morozov on December 17, 2022 at UFC Fight Night 216. He lost the fight via unanimous decision.

Newson is scheduled to face Brian Kelleher on April 29, 2023 at UFC Fight Night 223.

Championships and accomplishments
CageSport MMA
CageSport Bantamweight Championship (one time)
Prime Fighting MMA
Prime Fighting Bantamweight Championship (one time)

Mixed martial arts record

|-
|Loss
|align=center|10–4 (1)
|Sergey Morozov
|Decision (unanimous)
|UFC Fight Night: Cannonier vs. Strickland
| 
|align=center|3
|align=center|5:00
|Las Vegas, Nevada, United States
|
|-
|Win
|align=center|10–3 (1)
|Fernie Garcia
|Decision (unanimous)
|UFC 274
|
|align=center|3
|align=center|5:00
|Phoenix, Arizona, United States
|
|-
|Loss
| align=center|9–3 (1)
| Randy Costa
| KO (head kick)
| UFC Fight Night: Covington vs. Woodley
| 
| align=center| 1
| align=center| 0:41
| Las Vegas, Nevada, United States
|
|-
| NC
| align=center| 9–2 (1)
| Domingo Pilarte
| NC (overturned)
| UFC 247
| 
| align=center| 1
| align=center| 0:38
| Houston, Texas, United States
|
|-
|Loss
| align=center|9–2
|Ricardo Ramos
|Decision (unanimous)
|UFC on ESPN: Ngannou vs. dos Santos 
|
|align=center|3
|align=center|5:00
|Minneapolis, Minnesota, United States
|
|-
| Win
| align=center|9–1
| Soslan Abanokov
| KO (punch)
| Final Fight Championship 36
| 
| align=center|1
| align=center|1:20
| Las Vegas, Nevada, United States
|
|-
| Win
| align=center|8–1
| Chris SanJose
| TKO (punches)
| Prime Fighting 11
| 
| align=center|2
| align=center|4:41
| Ridgefield, Washington, United States
|
|-
| Win
| align=center|7–1
| Tycen Lynn
| Decision (unanimous)
| Combat Games 60
| 
| align=center| 3
| align=center| 5:00
| Tulalip, Washington, United States
|
|-
| Win
| align=center| 6–1
| Anthony Zender
| TKO
| CageSport 46
| 
| align=center|2
| align=center|0:24
| Tacoma, Washington, United States
| 
|-
| Win
| align=center| 5–1
| Jordan Mackin
| Submission (rear-naked choke)
| CageSport 44
|
|align=Center|3
|align=center|4:55
|Tacoma, Washington, United States
| 
|-
| Win
| align=center| 4–1
| Anthony Zender
| Submission (guillotine choke)
| CageSport 43
| 
| align=center| 3
| align=center| 1:27
| Tacoma, Washington, United States
| 
|-
| Loss
| align=center| 3–1
| Benito Lopez
|KO (punches)
|KOTC: Unchallenged
|
|align=center|1
|align=center|3:04
|Oroville, California, United States
| 
|-
| Win
| align=center| 3–0
| Shane Friesz
| Decision (unanimous)
|Super Fight League 49
| 
| align=center| 3
| align=center| 5:00
| Tacoma, Washington, United States
| 
|-
| Win
| align=center| 2–0
| Justin Hugo
| Submission (triangle choke)
| Super Fight League 45
| 
| align=center| 1
| align=center| 2:17
| Tacoma, Washington, United States
|
|-
| Win
| align=center| 1–0
| Damon Wood
| Decision (unanimous)
| KOTC: Rogue Wave
| 
| align=center| 3
| align=center| 5:00
| Lincoln City, Oregon, United States
|

Professional boxing record

See also 
 List of current UFC fighters
 List of male mixed martial artists

References

External links 
  
 

Living people
1989 births
Bantamweight mixed martial artists
Mixed martial artists utilizing taekwondo
Mixed martial artists utilizing boxing
Mixed martial artists utilizing Brazilian jiu-jitsu
American male mixed martial artists
Ultimate Fighting Championship male fighters
American male taekwondo practitioners
American male boxers
American practitioners of Brazilian jiu-jitsu
People awarded a black belt in Brazilian jiu-jitsu